The Donegal Senior Ladies' Football Championship is an annual LGFA competition organised by Donegal LGFA among the top ladies' football clubs in County Donegal. 

The winner qualifies to represent the county in the Ulster Ladies' Senior Club Football Championship, the winner of which progresses to the All-Ireland Senior Club Ladies' Football Championship. The winners are presented with the Donna Dunnion Boyle Memorial Cup, which was inaugurated in 2022. Ms Dunnion Boyle was the husband of Brendan Boyle and the sister of Barry Dunnion. Previously the winners had been presented with the Dom Breslin Cup. 

Glenfin are the 2021 champions. St Eunan's are the most successful club, with 13 titles.

Winners and finalists

Results by team

Finals listed by year

References

Explanatory notes

External links
 Official Donegal Website
 Donegal on Hoganstand
 Donegal Club GAA

Donegal GAA club championships